The 1989–90 season was the 66th season in the existence of AEK Athens F.C. and the 31st consecutive season in the top flight of Greek football. They competed in the Alpha Ethniki, the Greek Cup, the Greek Super Cup, the Greek League Cup and the European Cup. The season began on 26 August 1989 and finished on 2 June 1990.

Overview

With Stratos Gidopoulos and Dušan Bajević at the wheel for the second season in a row, having won the championship of the previous season and having included Daniel Batista in their roster, AEK started the 1989–90 season with great optimism. They played good football and had the best defense in the league for the second consecutive year, but in the end they finished in the second place behind Panathinaikos. The greatest victories of the season were the 8–0 against Skonda Xanthi and the 7–1 against Panionios.

The start was good, as AEK won the Super Cup on penalties against Panathinaikos. Shortly afterwards, the epic showdown came against Dynamo Dresden where, despite the defeat in Germany by 1–0, AEK played a magical game in the rematch of AEK Stadium and prevailed with the incredible 5–3 in a game that had it all and showed the potential of the team. However, the draw brought AEK Athens facing Marseille of Bernard Tapie. In the first match in Marseille, the referee Sandoz canceled a clean goal by Patikas and AEK lost 2–0. In the rematch in Nea Filadelfeia, the French reported an attack on the team bus, the match was ended 1–1 and eventually UEFA punished the club with one-year ban from all European competitions.

Many players stood out this season such as Savevski, Okoński, Batista, Manolas, Savvidis, Patikas and Christodoulou. The club's top scorer for the season in the league was Daniel Batista with 15 goals. In the Cup, the team got knocked-out for the second consecutive season of exclusion-shock in the round of 32, this time by the newly promoted Ionikos. With the conquering of the League Cup on 2 June 1990 against Olympiacos, in an event that eventually took place only this season, AEK completed their competitive obligations.

Players

Squad information

NOTE: The players are the ones that have been announced by the AEK Athens' press release. No edits should be made unless a player arrival or exit is announced. Updated 30 June 1990, 23:59 UTC+3.

Transfers

In

Summer

Out

Summer

Loan out

Summer

Renewals

Overall transfer activity

Expenditure
Summer:  ₯2,200,000

Winter:  ₯0

Total:  ₯2,200,000

Income
Summer:  ₯0

Winter:  ₯0

Total:  ₯0

Net Totals
Summer:  ₯2,200,000

Winter:  ₯0

Total:  ₯2,200,000

Pre-season and friendlies

Greek Super Cup

Alpha Ethniki

League table

Results summary

Results by Matchday

Fixtures

Greek Cup

Group 5
<onlyinclude>

Matches

Round of 32

League Cup

Matches

Semi-finals

Final

European Cup

First round

Second round

Statistics

Squad statistics

! colspan="15" style="background:#FFDE00; text-align:center" | Goalkeepers
|-

! colspan="15" style="background:#FFDE00; color:black; text-align:center;"| Defenders
|-

! colspan="15" style="background:#FFDE00; color:black; text-align:center;"| Midfielders
|-

! colspan="15" style="background:#FFDE00; color:black; text-align:center;"| Forwards
|-

|}

Disciplinary record

|-
! colspan="23" style="background:#FFDE00; text-align:center" | Goalkeepers

|-
! colspan="23" style="background:#FFDE00; color:black; text-align:center;"| Defenders

|-
! colspan="23" style="background:#FFDE00; color:black; text-align:center;"| Midfielders

|-
! colspan="23" style="background:#FFDE00; color:black; text-align:center;"| Forwards

|}

References

External links
AEK Athens F.C. Official Website

AEK Athens F.C. seasons
AEK Athens